McKean Township may refer to the following townships in the United States:

 McKean Township, Licking County, Ohio
 McKean Township, Erie County, Pennsylvania